Philip J. Powers (July 26, 1854 – December 22, 1914) was a major league baseball catcher from 1878 to 1885.

He was used mostly as a backup for five different teams in the National League and American Association.

External links
 Baseball Reference

1854 births
1914 deaths
Baseball players from New York City
Chicago White Stockings players
Boston Red Caps players
Cincinnati Red Stockings (AA) players
Baltimore Orioles (AA) players
Cleveland Blues (NL) players
London Tecumseh players
Springfield (minor league baseball) players
New York Metropolitans (minor league) players
London Tecumsehs (baseball) players
19th-century baseball players
Burials at Saint Raymond's Cemetery (Bronx)